Thierry Pister (born 2 September 1965 in Belgium) is a former Belgian footballer and manager.

Honours
Standard Liège
 Belgian Cup: 1992–93

References

 weltfussball 
 Profile at RFC Tournai
 Profile - FC Antwerp

1965 births
Living people
Belgian footballers
Belgian expatriate footballers
Belgian Pro League players
K.A.A. Gent players
Royal Antwerp F.C. players
Ligue 1 players
Expatriate footballers in France
SC Toulon players
Standard Liège players
FC Lausanne-Sport players
K.S.K. Beveren players
Belgian football managers
K.S.K. Beveren managers
Expatriate footballers in Switzerland
K.V. Oostende managers
K.R.C. Mechelen managers
Footballers from Ghent
Association football midfielders
AC Allianssi managers